Ronald James Farmer (6 March 1936 – 9 June 2022) was a professional footballer from Guernsey who played as a left half and inside forward.

Career
Farmer began his career playing with St Aubins in Jersey and Northerners Athletic Club in Guernsey, before signing for Nottingham Forest in 1952. He moved to Coventry City in November 1958, playing in all four divisions of the Football League for the club. He later played for Notts County and Grantham Town.

After retiring as a player in 1970 he returned to Coventry City briefly to work as a youth coach, before working for the Massey Ferguson tractor factory.

References

1936 births
2022 deaths
Guernsey footballers
Association football wing halves
Association football inside forwards
English Football League players
Nottingham Forest F.C. players
Coventry City F.C. players
Notts County F.C. players
Grantham Town F.C. players
Coventry City F.C. non-playing staff
Association football coaches